Monica Culen is an Austrian founder and advocate for humanitarian causes. She is the co-founder and chief executive officer of Red Noses Clowndoctors International, the world's largest healthcare clowning organisation. In 1991, Culen helped create one of the first European hospital clown organisations. Since then, she founded eleven Red Noses hospital clown organisations worldwide and currently sits on the board of directors for most organisations.  For her contributions to Austrian society, Culen has received the Silver Medal of Merit of the Republic of Austria [Silbernes Ehrenzeichen für Verdienste um die Republik Österreich] for her social services. She also served as chairwoman of the board for the European Federation of Hospital Clown Organisations from 2010 to 2020 and currently serves as chairwoman for the Austrian Fundraising Association, since 2004.

Early life 

Monica Culen was born in Vienna on February 10, 1948. She is a descendant of the Fischer-Pochtler industrial family. She is the daughter of Marietta Fischer Pochtler and Hannes Folter. Culen grew up in an entrepreneurial family, getting familiar with managerial responsibilities. Her brother, Christian Pochtler, is now CEO and owner of the Pochtler Industrieholding and iSi Group.

Professional background

Early career 
Monica Culen started her career as a chief hostess at the 1972 Summer Olympics in Munich. In 1974, she worked at the Institut Europeen d'Administration des Affairs (INSEAD) at Fontainebleau in France as a public relations assistant throughout the academic year of 1974–75.

In 1976, Culen was hired as the public relations and protocol officer at the newly established OPEC Fund for International Development. She oversaw the organisation's intergovernmental relations as well as the regular convening and organisation of ministerial conferences in Vienna, Africa and South America.

Hospital clowning 

In 1991, Culen co-founded one of the first European hospital clowning projects, Cliniclowns Österreich, and helped develop the strategic concepts and guidelines for such organizations in Austria, Netherlands and Belgium.
 
In 1994, Culen began a new project together with Giora Seeliger, the non-profit foundation ROTE NASEN Clowndoctors Österreich [RED NOSES Clowndoctors Austria]. Culen served as Managing Director until 2011, when she subsequently became President of the Board.

Then in 2003, Culen and Seeliger, along with additional support from Franz Haimerl, created RED NOSES Clowndoctors International. Since 1996, RED NOSES partner organisations in Germany, Hungary, Slovakia, Slovenia, Czech Republic, Croatia, Poland, Lithuania as well as branch offices in Jordan and Palestine were founded. Furthermore, RED NOSES Clowndoctors International undertakes humanitarian missions through the 'Emergency Smile' programme in crisis areas, refugee camps and other institutions worldwide.

Other associations 

Monica Culen was appointed as president of the Austrian Fundraising Association [Fundraising Verband Austria] in 2004. The FVA is a platform for non-profit organisations to help influence the formulation of relevant legislation concerning the non-profit sector in Austria.

Culen is also the founder and former Chair of the European Federation of Healthcare Clowns (EFHCO), the world's largest federation of hospital clown organisations. The federation defines binding quality requirements for the work of hospital clowns in order to professionalize their engagement with their beneficiaries and to define standards for a future certification.

From 2002 until 2008, Culen developed and was in charge of the first Austrian fundraising college. She was also a lecturer at the Fundraising School of the University of Indiana (USA).

References 

1949 births
Living people
Businesspeople from Vienna
20th-century Austrian businesswomen
20th-century Austrian businesspeople
21st-century Austrian businesswomen
21st-century Austrian businesspeople